Nationality words link to articles with information on the nation's poetry or literature (for instance, Irish or France).

Events
 September 12 – Abraham Sutzkever, a Polish Jew writing poetry in Yiddish, escapes the Vilna Ghetto with his wife and hides in the forests. Sutzkever and fellow Yiddish poet Shmerke Kaczerginsky, fight against the Nazis as partisans. During the Nazi era, Sutzkever writes more than eighty poems, whose manuscripts he manages to save for postwar publication.
 December – English poet Philip Larkin, having graduated from the University of Oxford, obtains his first post as a librarian (at Wellington, Shropshire).
 Babi Yar in poetry: poems are written about the 1941 Babi Yar massacres by Mykola Bazhan (Микола Бажан) of the Communist Party of the Soviet Union ("Babi Yar"); Sava Holovanivskyi ("Avraam" (Abraham)) and Kievan poet Olga Anstei (Ольга Николаевна Анстей) ("Kirillovskie iary"; "Kirillov Ravines", another name for Babi Yar). She defects this year from the Soviet Union to the West with her husband
 Nazi Propaganda Minister Joseph Goebbels closes theaters and publishers in Germany.
 Ezra Pound, still in Italy, is indicted for treason by the United States Attorney General.
 Canadian poet, critic and editor John Sutherland publishes a review of Patrick Anderson's poetry in his magazine First Statement (a rival to Anderson's Preview) which suggests homoerotic themes in his writing, and accuses Anderson of "some sexual experience of a kind not normal"; although Anderson would in fact come out as gay later in life, he is married at this time to Peggy Doernbach and threatens to sue. Sutherland prints a retraction in the following issue of his magazine.
 Ottawa native Elizabeth Smart moves permanently to England.
 Focus magazine founded in Jamaica.
 Poetry Scotland magazine founded in Glasgow by Maurice Lindsay.
 Publication of a new comprehensive edition of Friedrich Hölderlin's complete works (Sämtliche Werke, the "Große Stuttgarter Ausgabe"), begins.

Works published in English
Listed by nation where the work was first published and again by the poet's native land, if different; substantially revised works listed separately:

Canada
 Archibald Lampman, At The Long Sault, edited by Duncan Campbell Scott and E.K. Brown, a selection from Lampman's unpublished manuscripts; posthumous edition
 Wilson MacDonald, Greater Poems Of The Bible: metrical versions, biblical forms, and original poems
 E. J. Pratt, Still Life and Other Verse, Toronto: Macmillan.
 A.J.M. Smith, News of the Phoenix and Other Poems. Toronto: Ryerson Press. Governor General's Award 1943.
Anthologies
 Ralph Gustafson, editor, Canadian Poets, published by New Directions
 A.J.M. Smith, The Book of Canadian Poetry anthology - introduction identified modern poets in Canada as either in "The Native Tradition" or "The Cosmopolitan Tradition";
Criticism
 E.K. Brown, On Canadian Poetry. Governor General's Award 1943.

India, in English
 Sunderrao Rama Rao Dongerkery, The Ivory Tower (Poetry in English ), Baroda: East and West Book House
 Punjalal, Lotus Petals (Poetry in English ), Pondicherry: Sri Aurobindo Ashram
 Krishna Shungloo, The Night is Heavy (Poetry in English ), Lahore: Free India Publications
 K. R. Srinivasa Iyengar, Indo-Anglian Literature, a pioneering literary history

United Kingdom
 Kenneth Allott, The Ventriloquist's Doll
 Lilian Bowes Lyon, Evening in Stepney
 Cecil Day-Lewis, Word Over All
 Keith Douglas, Selected Poems
 Lawrence Durrell, A Private Country
 T. S. Eliot, Four Quartets (first collected, in U.S.)
 David Gascoyne, Poems 1937–1942
 Geoffrey Grigson, Under the Cliff, and Other Poems
 Michael Hamburger, Friedrich Hölderlin: Poems
 J. F. Hendry, The Orchestral Mountain
 Sidney Keyes, The Cruel Solstice
 Roy McFadden, Swords and Ploughshares, Northern Ireland poet
 John Pudney, Beyond This Disregard
 Kathleen Raine, Stone and Flower, with drawings by Barbara Hepworth
 Keidrych Rhys, pen name of William Ronald Rhys Jones, editor, More Poems From The Forces, anthology
 William Soutar, But the Earth Abideth
 Dylan Thomas, New Poems, Welsh
 Terence Tiller, The Inward Animal

United States
 Leonard Bacon, Day of Fire
 Stephen Vincent Benet, Western Star
 Kenneth Fearing, Afternoon of a Pawnbroker
 Robert Fitzgerald, A Wreath for the Sea
 Langston Hughes, Freedom's Plow
 Weldon Kees, The Last Man
 Archibald MacLeish, Colloquy for the States
 Edna St. Vincent Millay, Collected Lyrics
 Kenneth Patchen, Cloth of the Tempest
 Carl Sandburg, Home Front Memo
 Delmore Schwartz, Genesis: Book One
 Yvor Winters, The Giant Weapon, New Directions
 Elinor Wylie, Last Poems

Other in English
 Allen Curnow, Sailing or Drowning (Progressive Publishing Society), New Zealand

Works published in other languages
Listed by nation where the work was first published and again by the poet's native land, if different; substantially revised works listed separately:

France
 Louis Aragon, Le Musee Grevin
 Lanza del Vasto, Le Pèlerinage aux sources
 Andrée Chedid, On the Trails of my Fancy
 Robert Desnos, État de veille
 Luc Estang, Mystère apprivoisé
 André Frénaud, Les Rois Mages, Anthony Hartley called this book, "probably the best book of verse published at this time"; first edition (revised edition, 1966)
 Jean Follain, Usage de temps
 Francis Jammes, Elégies et poésies diverses
 André Pieyre de Mandiargues, Dans les années sordides
 Jules Supervielle, Poèmes de la France malheureuse
 Raymond Queneau, Les Ziaux

Indian subcontinent
Including all of the British colonies that later became India, Pakistan, Bangladesh, Sri Lanka and Nepal. Listed alphabetically by first name, regardless of surname:

 Abdul Shakoor, Daur-i jadid ke cand muntakhab Hindu shu'ara, short biographical sketches and reviews of Hindu poets in the Urdu language
 Acharya Bhagvat, Jivan Ani Sahitya, essays in Marathi, mostly translated from Bengali and Gujarati, including some on which are on Rabindranath Tagore; criticism
 Akhtarul Imam, Girdab, Urdu-language
 Balvantrai Thakore, Navin Kavita Vise Vyakkyano, published lectures in Gujarati by this poet and critic on the forms of Gujarati poetry; criticism
 Bawa Balwant Juala Mukhi, Punjabi
 D. R. Bendre, Meghaduta, translation into Kannada from the Sanskrit of Kalidasa's Meghaduta; the translation is in a modified ragale meter; one of the most popular translations of that poet into the Kannada language
 D. V. Gundappa, Mankuthimmana Kagga, "Song of Mankutimma", Kannada
 G. V. Krishna Rao, Kavya Jagattu, on Marxism, Freudian thought and Indian poetics; Telugu; criticism
 Gauri Shankar Bhadrawahi, Srimad Bhagvadgita, translation into Dogri–Badrawahi from the Sanskrit original
 Lutif Allah Badvi, Tazkira-Elutfi, first volume of a Sindhi-language history of Sindhi poetry (see also Volume 2, 1946, Volume 3 1952)
 Makhan Lal Chaturvedi, Sahitya Devata, essays in literary criticism; Hindi
 Narayan Bezbarua, Mahatmar Maha Prayanat, Indian, Assamese-language
 Agyeya, Tar Saptak, groundbreaking Hindi anthology of seven previously unpublished poets which began the Prayogvad ("Experimentalism") movement; that, in turn, grew into the Nayi kavita ("New Poetry") movement in Hindi poetry. "The importance of Tar Saptak to the development of Hindi verse cannot be overstated", according to Ludmila L. Rosenstein. The movement got its name as a derisive term coined by critics who noted the constant use of the word prayog ("experimentalism") in Agyeya's introduction. That introduction and later writings by Agyeya made him one of the chief literary critics in India in the rest of the 20th century. The anthology was reprinted in new editions, with the sixth appearing in 1996. The seven poets in this edition: Agyeya, Gajanan Madhav Muktibodh, Shamsher Bahadur Singh, Raghuvir Sahay, Sarveshwar Dayal Saxena, Kunwar Narain and Kedarnath Singh.
 Vijayrai Vaidya, Gujarati Sahityani Ruprekha, a Gujarati history of the literature in that language; scholarship

Other languages
 Chairil Anwar, "Aku" ("Me"), Indonesian
 Odysseus Elytis, Sun the First, Greek
 Gerardo Diego, Poemas adrede ("Purposeful Poems");Spain
 Sorley MacLean, Dàin do Eimhir agus Dàin Eile, Scottish Gaelic
 Eugenio Montale, Finisterre, a chapbook of poetry, smuggled into Switzerland by Gianfranco Contini; Lugano: the Collana di Lugano (June 24); second edition, 1945, Florence: Barbèra; Italy
 César Moro, pen name of César Quíspez Asín, Le château de grisou, Peru
 Luis Rosales and Luis Felipe Vivanco, editors, Sonetos à la piedra ("Sonnets to Stone"), anthology of heroic poetry; Spain
 Ole Sarvig, Grønne Digte ("Green Poems"), the author's first book of poems; Denmark

Awards and honors
 Consultant in Poetry to the Library of Congress (later the post would be called "Poet Laureate Consultant in Poetry to the Library of Congress"): Allen Tate appointed this year. He would serve until 1943.
 Frost Medal: Edna St. Vincent Millay
 Governor General's Award, poetry or drama: News of the Phoenix, A.J.M. Smith (Canada)

Births
Death years link to the corresponding "[year] in poetry" article:
 April 22 – Louise Glück, American poet laureate and winner of the 2020 Nobel Prize in Literature
 May 9 – Ellen Bryant Voigt, American poet
 May 11 – Michael Palmer, American poet, translator and winner of 2006 Wallace Stevens Award
 May 17 – Robert Adamson  (died 2022), Australian poet and publisher
 June 7 – Nikki Giovanni, African American poet, activist and author
 July 21 – Tess Gallagher, American poet, essayist, novelist and playwright
 July 22 – Hadi Khorsandi, Iranian poet and satirist
 August 14 – Alfred Corn, American poet and essayist
 September 12 – Michael Ondaatje, Canadian-Sri Lankan novelist and poet whose Booker Prize winning novel The English Patient is adapted into an Academy-Award-winning film
 October 1 – Justo Jorge Padrón (died 2021), Canarian Spanish poet, translator and lawyer
 October 2 – Franklin Rosemont (died 2009), American Surrealist poet, labor historian and co-founder of the Chicago Surrealist Group
 December 2 – John Balaban, American poet and translator
 December 8:
 James Tate, American poet, educator, man of letters and a winner of the Pulitzer Prize, National Book Award
 Jim Morrison (died 1971), American singer, songwriter, poet; best known as the lead singer and lyricist of The Doors
 December 9 – Michael Krüger, German poet, writer, publisher and translator
Also:
 Alan Bold (died 1998), Scottish poet
 Richard Berengarten, English poet
 Emanuel di Pasquale, American poet and translator
 Vicki Feaver, English poet
 Hadrawi (Mohamed Ibrahim Warsame) (died 2022), Somalian poet
 Tridib Mitra, Bengali poet associated with the 1961–1965 Hungryalism (or "Hungry Generation") movement
 Robert C. Morgan, American art critic, art historian, curator, poet and artist
 Ron Smith, Canadian poet, author, playwright and publisher
 Frederick Turner, English poet, critic and academic in the United States; editor of The Kenyon Review
 Bill Zavatsky, American poet, journalist, jazz pianist and translator

Deaths
Birth years link to the corresponding "[year] in poetry" article:
 January 3 – F. M. Cornford, 68 (born 1874), English classical scholar and poet
 January 31 – Loa Ho, 48 (born 1894), Taiwanese poet, died in jail
 February 27 – Kostis Palamas, 84 (born 1859) Greek poet
 March 10 – Lawrence Binyon, 72 (born 1869), English poet, dramatist and art scholar
 March 13 – Stephen Vincent Benét, 44 (born 1898), American poet, heart attack
 March 19 – Tsugi Takano 鷹野 つぎ, 52 (born 1890), Japanese novelist and poet (a woman; surname: Takano)
 April 29 – Sidney Keyes, 20 (born 1922), English poet killed in action in Tunisia
 May 29 – Guido Mazzoni, 84 (born 1859), Italian poet
 August 12 – Kurt Eggers, 37 (born 1905), Nazi German writer, poet, songwriter and playwright killed in action on the Eastern Front 
 September 13 – Sanjayan, pen name of M. R. Nayar, 40 (born 1903), Indian, Malayalam-language poet and academic
 October 7 – Radclyffe Hall, 63, English poet and author of the lesbian novel The Well of Loneliness
 October 15 – William Soutar, 45 (born 1898), leading poet of the Scottish Literary Renaissance. Bedridden from 1930, he died of tuberculosis
 October 24 – Hector de Saint-Denys Garneau, 31 (born 1912), Canadian considered "Quebec's first truly modern poet", heart disease
 November 22 – Lorenz Hart, 48 (born 1895), American lyricist
 November 24 – France Balantič, 21 (born 1921), Yugoslav Slovene poet killed as member of Slovene Home Guard in action against Slovene Partisans (b. 1921)
 November 26 – Charles G. D. Roberts, 83 (born 1860), Canadian poet and writer known as the "Father of Canadian Poetry" because he served as an inspiration for other writers of his time; also known as one of the "Confederation poets" (together with his cousin Bliss Carman, William Wilfred Campbell Archibald Lampman and Duncan Campbell Scott)
 November 27 – Louis Esson, 65 (born 1878), Australian poet and playwright
 December 2
 Drummond Allison (born 1921), English poet killed in action in Italy
 Nordahl Grieg, 41 (born 1902), Norwegian poet and author killed in action over Germany

See also

 Poetry
 List of poetry awards
 List of years in poetry

Notes

20th-century poetry

Poetry